The City People Magazine is a Nigerian soft-sell, entertainments magazine and newspaper awarding political people artists, actors and newspapers in publication of City People Media Group.

About magazine
The magazine was founded by City People Media Group in 1995 circulating all Nigerian regions, with the annual awarding event came to exist in 2005 together with City People Entertainment and was also launched in Ghana in 2009 by the high commissioner of Nigeria to Ghana, before the City People Group Media, it was published under Media Techniques Limited.

The City People Group Media was founded by Oluseye Olugbemiga Kehinde, a journalist who was publisher in African Confidential and once editor in  Herald newspaper, African Concord and Tempo magazine. It also awards Islamic artists which began existing in 2018.

References

Magazines published in Nigeria
1995 establishments in Nigeria
Online magazines published in Nigeria